The Dahomeyan Progressive Party (PPD)  was a short-lived political party in French Dahomey.

History
The party was established in 1958 as by the merger of the Republican Party of Dahomey led by Sourou-Migan Apithy and the Dahomeyan Democratic Rally led by Hubert Maga. It affiliated with the African Regroupment Party.

However, the party collapsed the following year due to internal disagreements over the future relationship with France. As a result, the two factions split back into the original parties. The following year they merged again, this time alongside the National Liberation Movement to form the Dahomeyan Unity Party.

References

Political parties established in 1958
Political parties disestablished in 1959
Defunct political parties in Benin
1958 establishments in French West Africa